The Supercopa de España de Baloncesto Femenino (English: Spanish Women's Basketball Supercup) is an annual preseason Spanish professional women's basketball competition.

Format
The teams that take part in this competition are:

 The Liga Femenina winner of the previous season.
 The Copa de la Reina winner of the previous season (or the Cup's runner-up if both teams coincide)

Winners by season

Titles by team

See also
Liga Femenina
Copa de la Reina

External links
Winners by year (bottom of page)

1
Recurring sporting events established in 2003
Women's basketball competitions in Spain
Women's basketball supercup competitions in Europe